The Last Supper (Spanish: La última cena) a 1976 Cuban historical film directed by Tomás Gutiérrez Alea, produced by the Instituto Cubano del Arte y la Industria Cinematográficos (ICAIC) and starring Nelson Villagra as the Count.

Synopsis
The film tells the story of a pious Havana plantation owner in the 1790s, during Cuba's Spanish colonial period. The plantation owner decides to recreate the Biblical Last Supper using twelve of the slaves working in his sugarcane fields, hoping to thus teach the slaves about Christianity.

In a misguided attempt to enlighten his African-originating slaves, a Count invites twelve of them to a dinner on Maundy Thursday in a re-enactment of the Last Supper with himself as Christ.  Whilst they eat and drink, he also feeds them religious rhetoric and attempts to instruct them in the workings of Christianity.  He promises them a day off for the following Good Friday and commits to freeing one of the slaves.  However, when these promises are not held up the next day, the slaves rebel.  The slaves are then hunted down and killed by their master, except one who escapes.

See also 
 List of Cuban films
 List of films featuring slavery

References

External links

1970s historical films
1976 films
Cuban historical films
Films about slavery
Films directed by Tomás Gutiérrez Alea
Films set in the 1790s
Films set in Havana